"Diamonds on the Soles of Her Shoes" is a song by the American singer-songwriter Paul Simon. It was the fourth single from his seventh studio album, Graceland (1986), released on Warner Bros. Records. The song features guest vocals from the South African male choral group Ladysmith Black Mambazo.

Background
"Diamonds on the Soles of Her Shoes" was written when Simon went to South Africa. While he was there, he gathered various music from locals. Upon returning to New York, Simon finished the album with the artists he brought back from South Africa, according to Simon's account in the Classic Albums documentary on the making of Graceland.

Simon recalled that "Diamonds" wasn't originally planned for inclusion on Graceland. When Simon, Ladysmith Black Mambazo, and several of the South African studio musicians arrived in New York to perform on the May 10th episode of Saturday Night Live, which Simon was set to host, his label, Warner Bros., decided to release the album in the fall instead of the originally planned release that July. Simon and engineer Roy Halee then decided, with most of the major players involved in the recordings in town, to record "Diamonds", and to include it on the album.

Simon and Ladysmith Black Mambazo performed the song live during their second appearance on Saturday Night Live on November 22, 1986. During the performance, Simon sang live to the backing instrumental track featured on the album while Ladysmith mimed their parts. Ladysmith Black Mambazo sing in Zulu on the studio track. Their refrain roughly translates to: "It's not usual but in our days we see those things happen. They are women, they can take care of themselves."

"Diamonds on the Soles of Her Shoes" and "Homeless" were both rerecorded by Ladysmith Black Mambazo for the 2006 album Long Walk to Freedom.

Cash Box called "Diamonds on the Soles of Her Shoes" a "sweet, ethnic and graceful tune" and said that "Simon’s loaded lyrical political blast is laced, unsuspectingly, across the song by its placid melody."

Personnel
Paul Simon—lead vocals, guitar
Ray Phiri—guitar
Bakithi Kumalo—bass
Isaac Mtshali—drums
Youssou N'Dour, Babacar Faye, Assane Thaim, James Guyatt— percussion
Lenny Pickett—tenor saxophone
Earl Gardner—trumpet
Alex Foster—alto saxophone
Ladysmith Black Mambazo—vocals

Covers
The song has been covered by the Soweto String Quartet and features on their greatest hits collection.

English singer MIKA performed a live piano cover of the song on his BBC Radio 2 show The Art of Song in March 2016.

Charts

Certifications

Notes

References

Sources

 
 

Songs written by Paul Simon
Paul Simon songs
Song recordings produced by Paul Simon
1986 songs
1987 singles
Ladysmith Black Mambazo
Warner Records singles